José Santos Chocano Gastañodi (May 14, 1875 – December 13, 1934), more commonly known by his pseudonym "El Cantor de América", was a Peruvian poet, writer and diplomat, whose work was widely praised across Europe and Latin America. Considered by many to be one of the most important Spanish-American poets, his poetry of grandiloquent tone was very sonorous and full of color.

He produced lyrical poetry of singular intimacy, refined with formalism, within the molds of modernism. His work is inspired by the themes, the landscapes and the people of Peru and of America in general. He became the most popular writer in Peru after Ricardo Palma, although his ascendancy in Peruvian literary circles gradually diminished, to the benefit of another great poet of Peru, César Vallejo.

He claimed to have rediscovered Latin America through verse in his 1906 collection Alma América, which carried an introduction by the distinguished philosopher-poet Miguel de Unamuno. Chocano was involved in many violent feuds with other intellectuals, and was jailed for shooting a journalist who had criticized him. In his turn, Chocano was stabbed to death on a tram in Santiago de Chile by an unknown assailant.

Chocano is remembered by most Peruvians as a great poet; his compositions "Blazon", "The horses of the conquerors" and "Who knows! ..." are classics of recitations to the present.

Life and work
Born in Lima, Peru, Chocano was admitted to the National University of San Marcos at the early age of 14 years.
After a short term in jail for political activism, he relocated to Madrid in the early 20th century. In this city his poems were first recognized by the Spanish literary and artistic circles; many notable artist and writers invited him to recite his poems at their reunions. This allowed Chocano to interact with prominent Spanish and Latin American intellectuals and artist such as Juan Gris, who become known by this pseudonym by signing the illustrations that he created for Chocano's book entitled Alma América and Poemas Indoespañoles (Soul America: Indo-Spanish poems) in 1906; Miguel de Unamuno, who wrote the prologue for Alma América; Marcelino Menéndez y Pelayo; and Rubén Darío; and thus his name reached a prominent status not only in Spain, but in France and all over Latin America. His 1906 poetry collection, Alma América, was offered and taken as a "New World" corrective to the purportedly cosmopolitan modernismo of Rubén Darío. Chocano was a sophisticated writer whose metrics and creativity were sought by many statesmen who contracted his services as a writer and adviser for many years. He worked for  different regimes and traveled a decade and a half through Latin and Central America, where he befriended a variety of political figures from different points on the ideological spectrum, such as Pancho Villa in Mexico, Manuel Estrada Cabrera in Guatemala, and Woodrow Wilson in the USA, with whom he struck up a correspondence. 
After the coup which deposed Estrada Cabrera in 1920, Chocano was briefly imprisoned, and subsequently returned to Peru, where he became associated with President Augusto B. Leguía. On November 5, 1922,  Chocano was recognized by the government of Peru as a most notable poet of Peru, he was laureated as "The Poet of America" in a ceremony featuring Leguia himself, various ministers, delegates from all the provinces of Peru, and a number of young and established writers.

Three years later, Chocano became embroiled in a dispute with Mexican intellectual José Vasconcelos; when Peruvian students sided with Vasconcelos, Chocano phoned the journalist Edwin Elmore to complain about his recent article on the polemic; insults and threats quickly followed. Elmore dashed off an article detailing Chocano's attack on him, and hurried to his office at the newspaper "El Comercio" to insert it. Unfortunately, as Elmore left the building, Chocano arrived at it, and after Elmore slapped Chocano, the latter pulled a gun and shot the young journalist in the stomach. Elmore died soon after.

Released after two years in jail, Chocano moved to Santiago de Chile, where he lived in dire poverty while preparing a new collection of poetry, Primicias de Oro de Indias. He was stabbed to death on a streetcar in 1934; reports are divided as to whether his assassin was a stranger, a madman, or a rival in a love affair. It is thought that his murder had to do with his political positions.

Style
Chocano is considered one of the most important leaders of the Latin-American Modernism, sharing this distinction with Ruben Darío (Nicaragua), Manuel González Prada (Peru), José Martí (Cuba), Manuel Gutiérrez Nájera (México), José Asunción Silva (Colombia) and others. However, Chocano's style is difficult to classify exactly, since it is very diverse and copious: for instance, some experts state that his writing is nearer to romanticism that to modernism; while others, like the American critic, Willis Knapp Jones, have denominated Chocano's work as "novomundista", i.e., a poet writing about the "new World" or America. Chocano was a very prolific poet, who also wrote epic and lyric poems.

References

Further reading

Popular books

 1895: En la aldea
 1895: Iras santas
 1896: Azahares
 1898: Selva virgen
 1899: La epopeya del Morro
 1901: El fin de Satán y otros poemas
 1904: Los cantos del Pacífico
 1906: Alma América, (prologue by Miguel de Unamuno)
 1908: Fiat Lux
 1914: Puerto Rico lírico y otros poemas
 1934: Primicias de Oro de Indias
 1937: Poemas de amor doliente
 1941: Oro de Indias

External links 

 Biography, bibliography, and poetry
 Brief biography

1875 births
1934 deaths
19th-century Peruvian poets
Peruvian people imprisoned abroad
Prisoners and detainees of Guatemala
Mestizo writers
National University of San Marcos alumni
Peruvian male poets
20th-century Peruvian poets
Deaths by stabbing in Chile
People murdered in Chile
Peruvian murder victims
Writers from Lima
19th-century male writers
20th-century male writers